Pohang Gyeongju Airport is an airport in Pohang, South Korea . In 2011, 255,227 passengers used the airport.

History
Pohang Airfield was originally developed during the Japanese Imperial period.

Korean war

In early July 1950 Pohang airfield was identified as a potential base for USAF operations. On 7 July, Brigadier-General Timberlake deputy-commander of the Fifth Air Force ordered the development of the base. Company A 802nd Engineer Aviation Battalion landed at Pohang and began improving the airfield on 12 July by added a  PSP extension and building hardstands for 27 F-51 Mustangs. The airfield was designated by the USAF as K-3.

Troops of the Korean People's Army (KPA) 12th Division infiltrated the Pohang area in early August and made guerilla attacks against the airfield. By 12 August KPA troops entered Pohang and so on 13 August the 35th Fighter-Interceptor Group evacuated to Tsuiki Air Field in Japan. ROK and U.S. forces routed the KPA several days later, but the continued presence of guerilla units mitigated against an early return to the base.

USAF units based there from July–August 1950 included:
35th Fighter-Interceptor Group from 14 July-13 August 1950 subordinate units included:
39th Fighter-Interceptor Squadron operating F-51s from 8–13 August 1950
40th Fighter-Interceptor Squadron operating F-51s from 16 July-13 August 1950
6131st Air Base Squadron (later 6131st Tactical Support Wing) from 14 July 1950

The 802nd Battalion returned to Pohang on 27 September finding the airfield relatively undamaged. The 35th Fighter-Interceptor Group returned to Pohang on 3 October. On 12 October No. 77 Squadron RAAF operating F-51s arrived at Pohang.

In July 1953 the United States Navy deployed two AJ (A-2) Savage aircraft to K-3 as a nuclear deterrent in the final days of the Korean War.

In March 15, 1999 Pohang airport was the site of Korean Air Flight 1533 a McDonnell Douglas MD-83 which was flying from Seoul To Pohang. The flight overshot runway 10 during landing at Pohang Airport. All 156 people on board survived, but the aircraft was destroyed. The accidient was the  11th hull loss of an McDonnell Douglas MD-80.[1]

Current
In October 2008 the United States Navy relocated a permanent detachment of MH-53E Sea Dragons assigned to HM-14 from Iwakuni, Japan. This detachment provides Seventh Fleet with a forward-deployed AMCM and heavy-lift asset. Because Pohang Gyeongju Airport is sharing with military, taking photograph or video of apron, runway and military facility is strictly prohibited.

Airlines and destinations

Statistics

Access

Bus
 No. 200 : Yangdeok ↔ Lotte Department Store ↔ Jukdo Market ↔ POSCO ↔ Pohang Gyeongju Airport ↔ Guryongpo

References

External links
Official website (Archive)

Airports in South Korea
Military installations of the United States in South Korea
Airports established in 1970
1970 establishments in South Korea
20th-century architecture in South Korea